Stenotarsus vallatus, is a species of handsome fungus beetle found in India and Sri Lanka.

Description
Antenna reddish, and gradually thickened. The series of punctures are more regular and fine.

References 

Endomychidae
Insects of Sri Lanka
Insects described in 1858